The 1964 Liverpool Scotland by-election was a parliamentary by-election held in England on 11 June 1964 for the House of Commons constituency of Liverpool Scotland.

The by-election filled the vacancy left by the death of the Labour Member of Parliament (MP) David Logan on 25 February the same year. The seat was retained by the Labour Party.

Results

References

Liverpool Scotland by-election
Liverpool Scotland by-election
Scotland by-election
Liverpool Scotland by-election
Scotland, 1964